Oyster is the second studio album by Heather Nova, released in 1994.

Track listing
All songs written by Heather Nova.

"Walk This World" – 3:49
"Heal" – 3:55
"Island" – 6:20
"Throwing Fire at the Sun" – 5:57
"Maybe an Angel" – 5:08
"Sugar" (not on first European release) – 5:34
"Truth and Bone" – 4:54
"Blue Black" – 4:36
"Walking Higher" – 4:12
"Light Years" – 4:49
"Verona" – 4:02
"Doubled Up" – 3:39 (4:13 on some non us releases, there is some 30 seconds of some instruments tuning and someone saying 'yes' before the actual song starts)

B-sides
"Home"
"Blind"
"Walk This World" (acoustic)
Notes

Personnel
Heather Nova – acoustic guitar, vocals
David Ayers – bass, electric guitar, 12 string guitar
Nadia Lanman – cello
Dean McCormick – percussion, drums
Hossam Ramzy – percussion
Bob  Thompson – drums
Youth – bass
Felix Tod, Youth – producers
David Bianco, Christopher Marc Potter, Paul Rabiger – engineers
The album is dedicated to her first cousin once removed Signe Savannah (last name unknown), who was born the year of its release.

Charts

Weekly charts

Year-end charts

Singles

References

Heather Nova albums
1994 albums
Albums produced by Youth (musician)